The Meffan Institute is a museum and art gallery in Forfar, Angus. It houses a variety of exhibits of local interest in Angus, including a collection of Pictish stones, particularly the Dunnichen Stone and the Kirriemuir Sculptured Stones as well as Roman and Medieval artefacts found in the local area. A reconstruction of historic scenes of Forfar includes representations of daily life as it would have been around the beginning of the 19th century, as well as a depiction of the execution of one of the women accused of witchcraft in the Forfar witch hunts of 1661-1666.

Gallery

External links
Meffan Museum and Art Gallery on Angus Alive website
The Meffan Gallery on Facebook
The Meffan Museum and Art Gallery on Tripadvisor

Museums in Angus, Scotland
Local museums in Scotland
Art museums and galleries in Scotland
Museums established in 1898
1898 establishments in Scotland
Archaeological museums in Scotland
Forfar